Esting station is a railway station in the Esting district of the municipality of Olching, located in the district of Fürstenfeldbruck in Upper Bavaria, Germany.

References

External links

Munich S-Bahn stations
Railway stations in Bavaria
Buildings and structures in Fürstenfeldbruck (district)